African Methodist Episcopal Church may refer to:

African Methodist Episcopal Church, a religious denomination, or the similar African Methodist Episcopal Zion Church.
List of African Methodist Episcopal Churches
African Methodist Episcopal Church (Cumberland, Maryland), listed on the National Register of Historic Places